Voznyak is a  surname. Notable people with the surname include:

Anastasiya Voznyak (born 1998), Ukrainian rhythmic gymnast
Ihor Voznyak
Taras Voznyak (born 1957), Ukrainian writer

See also
 
Vozniak, surname

Ukrainian-language surnames